Call to arms may refer to:

Television
 "A Call to Arms" (Charmed), an episode of the television series Charmed
 Babylon 5: A Call to Arms, the fourth feature-length film set in the Babylon 5 universe
 "Call to Arms" (Star Trek: Deep Space Nine), the twenty-sixth and final episode of the fifth season of the television series Star Trek: Deep Space Nine

Music
 Call to Arms (Sick of It All album)
 Call to Arms (C4 album)
 Call to Arms (Saxon album)
 A Call to Arms (EP), a 2001 EP by Bandits of the Acoustic Revolution
 Called to Arms, a progressive metal band from Raleigh, NC
 "Call to Arms", a song by Manowar from the album Warriors of the World
 "Call to Arms", a song by Angels and Airwaves from the album I-Empire
 "Call to Arms", a song by Soulfly from the album 3
 "A Call to Arms", a song by Bayside from the album Shudder
 "A Call to Arms", a song by Mike + The Mechanics from their self-titled album

Literature
 Call to Arms (Lu Xun), collection of short stories by Chinese writer Lu Xun
 Call to Arms, the second book in The Corps Series by American writer W.E.B. Griffin
 A Call to Arms, a novel by Alan Dean Foster, the first in The Damned Trilogy
 A Call to Arms, a novel by David Weber, the second in the Manticore Ascendant series, and set in the Honorverse universe

Games
 Call to Arms (video game), a 2018 video game
 Call to Arms (1982 video game)
 Babylon 5: A Call to Arms (game), a wargame by Mongoose Publishing, set in the Babylon 5 universe